Singbulli Tea Garden is  a village in the Mirik CD block in the Mirik subdivision of the Darjeeling district in the state of West Bengal, India.

History
Singbulli Tea Garden was established by the British planters in 1924. Jay Shree Tea took over the 
garden in 2003.

Geography

Location
The garden has four divisions – Singbulli, Manja, Tingling and Murmah.

Area overview
The map alongside shows a part of the southern portion of the Darjeeling Himalayan hill region  in the Darjeeling district. In the Darjeeling Sadar subdivision 61.00% of the total population lives in the rural areas and 39.00% of the population lives in the urban areas. In the Mirik subdivision 80.11% of the total population lives in the rural areas and 19.89% lives in the urban areas. There are 78 tea gardens/ estates (the figure varies slightly according to different sources), in the district, producing and largely exporting Darjeeling tea. It engages a large proportion of the population directly/ indirectly. Some tea gardens were identified in the 2011 census as census towns or villages. Such places are marked in the map as CT (census town) or R (rural/ urban centre). Specific tea estate pages are marked TE. 

Note: The map alongside presents some of the notable locations in the subdivision. All places marked in the map are linked in the larger full screen map.

Demographics
According to the 2011 Census of India, Singbulli Tea Garden had a total population of 3,306 of which 1,658 (50%) were males and 1,648 (50%) were females. There were 296 persons in the age range of 0 to 6 years. The total number of literate people in Singbulli Tea Garden was 2,561 (77.47% of the population over 6 years).

Economy
Singbulli Tea Garden produces 250 tonnes of Darjeeling tea annually and that includes black tea, green tea and speciality teas. Clonal Tea, First Flush Tea, Second Flush Tea and Autumn Tea from Singbulli are famous.

Singbulli Tea Garden is 100% organic tea certified by IMO Control, DUTCH HACCP by SGS, and certified for fair trade.

Singbulli Tea Garden employs 1,325 workers.

Other tea gardens owned by the Jay Shree Tea & Manufacturing of the B.K.Birla Group are: Puttabong (Tukvar) Tea Estate, Sungma Tea Garden, North Tukvar Tea Estate, Rishihat Tea Garden and Balasun.

References

External links
 

Villages in Darjeeling district